TennGreen Land Conservancy, formerly the Tennessee Parks and Greenways Foundation, is a non-profit land trust, established in 1998 to protect natural and scenic land in Tennessee. It is accredited by the Land Trust Alliance's Land Trust Accreditation Commission. The foundation is supported by membership donations, individual philanthropy, and gifts of land from private landowners.

The foundation's mission is to conserve natural monuments such as waterfalls, bluffs and caves. Conservation of such features usually creates relatively small reserves that are not environmentally sustainable in isolation, so the foundation also aims to create corridors of conserved land to link these features and larger reserves (such as national parks and state parks), which are also called greenways.

Acquisitions
Stillhouse Hollow Falls, a  tract including a  waterfall, was acquired by the foundation in 2006 for $130,000. The tract was sold to the State of Tennessee for $97,500 for perpetual preservation as a natural reserve.

The intention was to expand this to  along the Mississippi River through further acquisitions financed by gifts and government grants.

In 2010, the foundation established Cummins Falls State Park, a day-use park of  including a  waterfall popular for its natural swimming hole. The natural pool was named by Travel + Leisure as one of America's best swimming holes.

In 2017, the foundation entered into a conservation easement with Swan Conservation Trust to permanently preserve  of forest known as the Big Swan Headwaters Preserve, adjacent to The Farm in Lewis County, Tennessee. The same year, the foundation purchased 1,000 acres of Grassy Cove, one of North America's largest sinkholes. A portion of the Grassy Cove, known as Karst Area, was designated a National Natural Landmark in 1973, and the foundation raised $2.2 million to preserve the area.

References

External links 

 Official website

Land trusts in the United States
Environmental organizations based in Tennessee
Environmental organizations established in 1998
1998 establishments in Tennessee